Radisson Blu City Centre Chennai is a 12-storied five-star hotel located in Egmore, Chennai, India. It is the second Radisson Blu hotel in the city after the Radisson Blu Chennai hotel near Chennai airport.

The hotel
The hotel has 162 rooms including 14 suites. It has 9,700 square feet of conference and meeting space that can accommodate up to 800 people. The hotel also has a business centre. Recreational facilities at the hotel include a spa called Chakra by Thai Sabai, a gymnasium, an outdoor swimming pool (which is closed) and a discothèque. There are four food-and-beverage outlets at the hotel, including a 24-hour coffee shop, a large bar with a separate cigar lounge, Radisson's signature restaurant The Great Kebab Factory and specialty coastal Japanese cuisine restaurant Raku Raku.

The hotel is designed by interior designer Vikram Phadke.

See also

Hotels in Chennai
Radisson Blu Hotel Chennai
List of tallest buildings in Chennai

References

External links
 Official website of Radisson Blu City Centre Chennai
 Homepage of Carlson Rezidor Hotel Group

Hotels in Chennai
Skyscraper hotels in Chennai
Hotels established in 2012
Hotel buildings completed in 2012
Radisson Blu